The 2017 edition of the Canadian Polaris Music Prize was presented on September 18, 2017.

Shortlist

The ten-album shortlist was announced on July 13.

Longlist

The prize's preliminary 40-album longlist was announced on June 13.

Heritage Prize
Nominees for the Polaris Heritage Prize, a separate award to honour classic Canadian albums released before the creation of the Polaris Prize, were announced at the main Polaris gala, and the winners were announced on October 25.

1960–1975
  Public: Gordon Lightfoot, Lightfoot!
  Jury: The Band, The Band
 The Band, Music from Big Pink
 Beau Dommage, Beau Dommage
 Robert Charlebois and Louise Forestier, Lindberg
 Joni Mitchell, Court and Spark
 Jackie Mittoo, Wishbone
 The Oscar Peterson Trio, Night Train
 Jackie Shane, Jackie Shane Live
 Neil Young, Everybody Knows This Is Nowhere

1976–1985
  Public: Harmonium, L'Heptade
  Jury: Glenn Gould, Bach: The Goldberg Variations
 Bruce Cockburn, Stealing Fire
 D.O.A., Hardcore '81
 Fifth Column, To Sir With Hate
 Gowan, Strange Animal
 Martha and the Muffins, This Is the Ice Age
 Jackie Mittoo, Showcase Volume 3
 Rough Trade, Avoid Freud
 Leroy Sibbles, On Top

1986–1995
  Public: The Tragically Hip, Fully Completely
  Jury: Eric's Trip, Love Tara
 Dream Warriors, And Now the Legacy Begins
 k. d. lang, Ingénue
 Daniel Lanois, Acadie
 Maestro Fresh Wes, Symphony in Effect
 Main Source, Breaking Atoms
 Sarah McLachlan, Fumbling Towards Ecstasy
 Alanis Morissette, Jagged Little Pill
 John Oswald, Plunderphonics

1996–2005
  Public: Feist, Let It Die
  Jury: k-os, Joyful Rebellion
 Bran Van 3000, Glee
 Broken Social Scene, You Forgot It in People
 Constantines, Shine a Light
 The Dears, No Cities Left
 Destroyer, Streethawk: A Seduction
 Esthero, Breath from Another
 The New Pornographers, Mass Romantic
 The Weakerthans, Left and Leaving

References

External links
 Polaris Music Prize

2017 in Canadian music
2017 music awards
2017